The glycocalyx, also known as the pericellular matrix, is a glycoprotein and glycolipid covering that surrounds the cell membranes of bacteria, epithelial cells, and other cells. In 1970, Martinez-Palomo discovered the cell coating in animal cells, which is known as the glycocalyx.

Animal epithelial cells have a fuzz-like coating on the external surface of their plasma membranes. This viscous coating is the glycocalyx that consists of several carbohydrate moieties of membrane glycolipids and glycoproteins, which serve as backbone molecules for support. Generally, the carbohydrate portion of the glycolipids found on the surface of plasma membranes helps these molecules contribute to cell–cell recognition, communication, and intercellular adhesion.

The glycocalyx is a type of identifier that the body uses to distinguish between its own healthy cells and transplanted tissues, diseased cells, or invading organisms. Included in the glycocalyx are cell-adhesion molecules that enable cells to adhere to each other and guide the movement of cells during embryonic development. The glycocalyx plays a major role in regulation of endothelial vascular tissue, including the modulation of red blood cell volume in capillaries.

The term was initially applied to the polysaccharide matrix coating epithelial cells, but its functions have been discovered to go well beyond that.

In vascular endothelial tissue

The glycocalyx is located on the apical surface of vascular endothelial cells which line the lumen. When vessels are stained with cationic dyes such as Alcian blue stain, transmission electron microscopy shows a small, irregularly shaped layer extending approximately 50–100 nm into the lumen of a blood vessel.  Another study used osmium tetroxide staining during freeze substitution, and showed that the endothelial glycocalyx could be up to 11 μm thick. It is present throughout a diverse range of microvascular beds (capillaries) and macrovessels (arteries and veins).  The glycocalyx also consists of a wide range of enzymes and proteins that regulate leukocyte and thrombocyte adherence, since its principal role in the vasculature is to maintain plasma and vessel-wall homeostasis.  These enzymes and proteins include:
Endothelial nitric oxide synthase (endothelial NOS)
Extracellular superoxide dismutase (SOD3)
Angiotensin converting enzyme
Antithrombin-III
Lipoprotein lipase
Apolipoproteins
Growth factors
Chemokines

The enzymes and proteins listed above serve to reinforce the glycocalyx barrier against vascular and other diseases.  Another main function of the glycocalyx within the vascular endothelium is that it shields the vascular walls from direct exposure to blood flow, while serving as a vascular permeability barrier.  Its protective functions are universal throughout the vascular system, but its relative importance varies depending on its exact location in the vasculature.  In microvascular tissue, the glycocalyx serves as a vascular permeability barrier by inhibiting coagulation and leukocyte adhesion.  Leukocytes must not stick to the vascular wall because they are important components of the immune system that must be able to travel to a specific region of the body when needed.  In arterial vascular tissue, the glycocalyx also inhibits coagulation and leukocyte adhesion, but through mediation of shear stress-induced nitric oxide release.  Another protective function throughout the cardiovascular system is its ability to affect the filtration of interstitial fluid from capillaries into the interstitial space.

The glycocalyx, which is located on the apical surface of endothelial cells, is composed of a negatively charged network of proteoglycans, glycoproteins, and glycolipids.

Disruption and disease

Because the glycocalyx is so prominent throughout the cardiovascular system, disruption to this structure has detrimental effects that can cause disease. Certain stimuli that cause atheroma may lead to enhanced sensitivity of vasculature. Initial dysfunction of the glycocalyx can be caused by hyperglycemia or oxidized low-density lipoproteins (LDLs), which then causes atherothrombosis. In microvasculature, dysfunction of the glycocalyx leads to internal fluid imbalance, and potentially edema. In arterial vascular tissue, glycocalyx disruption causes inflammation and atherothrombosis.

Experiments have been performed to test precisely how the glycocalyx can be altered or damaged.  One particular study used an isolated perfused heart model designed to facilitate detection of the state of the vascular barrier portion, and sought to cause insult-induced shedding of the glycocalyx to ascertain the cause-and-effect relationship between glycocalyx shedding and vascular permeability.  Hypoxic perfusion of the glycocalyx was thought to be sufficient to initiate a degradation mechanism of the endothelial barrier.  The study found that flow of oxygen throughout the blood vessels did not have to be completely absent (ischemic hypoxia), but that minimal levels of oxygen were sufficient to cause the degradation.  Shedding of the glycocalyx can be triggered by inflammatory stimuli, such as tumor necrosis factor-alpha.  Whatever the stimulus is, however, shedding of the glycocalyx leads to a drastic increase in vascular permeability.  Vascular walls being permeable is disadvantageous, since that would enable passage of some macromolecules or other harmful antigens.

Other sources of damage to the endothelial glycocalyx has been observed several pathological conditions such as inflammation, hyperglycemia, ischemia-reperfusion, and viral infections.

Fluid shear stress is also a potential problem if the glycocalyx is degraded for any reason.  This type of frictional stress is caused by the movement of viscous fluid (i.e. blood) along the lumen boundary. Another similar experiment was carried out to determine what kinds of stimuli cause fluid shear stress. The initial measurement was taken with intravital microscopy, which showed a slow-moving plasma layer, the glycocalyx, of 1 μm thick.  Light dye damaged the glycocalyx minimally, but that small change increased capillary hematocrit. Thus, fluorescence light microscopy should not be used to study the glycocalyx because that particular method uses a dye. The glycocalyx can also be reduced in thickness when treated with oxidized LDL. These stimuli, along with many other factors, can cause damage to the delicate glycocalyx.  These studies are evidence that the glycocalyx plays a crucial role in cardiovascular system health.

In bacteria and nature

A glycocalyx, literally meaning "sugar coat" (glykys = sweet, kalyx = husk), is a network of polysaccharides that project from cellular surfaces of bacteria, which classifies it as a universal surface component of a bacterial cell, found just outside the bacterial cell wall.  A distinct, gelatinous glycocalyx is called a capsule, whereas an irregular, diffuse layer is called a slime layer.  This coat is extremely hydrated and stains with ruthenium red.

Bacteria growing in natural ecosystems, such as in soil, bovine intestines, or the human urinary tract, are surrounded by some sort of glycocalyx-enclosed microcolony.  It serves to protect the bacterium from harmful phagocytes by creating capsules or allowing the bacterium to attach itself to inert surfaces, such as teeth or rocks, via biofilms (e.g. Streptococcus pneumoniae attaches itself to either lung cells, prokaryotes, or other bacteria which can fuse their glycocalices to envelop the colony).

In the digestive tract

A glycocalyx can also be found on the apical portion of microvilli within the digestive tract, especially within the small intestine.  It creates a meshwork 0.3 μm thick and consists of acidic mucopolysaccharides and glycoproteins that project from the apical plasma membrane of epithelial absorptive cells.  It provides additional surface for adsorption and includes enzymes secreted by the absorptive cells that are essential for the final steps of digestion of proteins and sugars.

Other generalized functions
Protection: Cushions the plasma membrane and protects it from chemical injury
Immunity to infection: Enables the immune system to recognize and selectively attack foreign organisms
Defense against cancer: Changes in the glycocalyx of cancerous cells enable the immune system to recognize and destroy them.
Transplant compatibility: Forms the basis for compatibility of blood transfusions, tissue grafts, and organ transplants
Cell adhesion: Binds cells together so that tissues do not fall apart
Inflammation regulation: Glycocalyx coating on endothelial walls in blood vessels prevents leukocytes from rolling/binding in healthy states.
Fertilization: Enables sperm to recognize and bind to eggs
Embryonic development: Guides embryonic cells to their destinations in the body

References

External links 
 Smart carbohydrate chemistry as a means to understand glycocalyx biology  – Video by the Lindhorst group at Beilstein TV

Cell biology
Polysaccharides
Glycobiology
Polymers